William Bushamuka (born January 24, 1996) is an American tennis player of Congolese descent.

Bushamuka has a career high ATP singles ranking of 904, achieved on November 11, 2019. He also has a career high ATP doubles ranking of 638, achieved on October 7, 2019. He has won two ITF doubles title.

Bushamuka represents DR Congo at the Davis Cup, where he has a W/L record of 7–1.

References

External links

1996 births
Living people
American male tennis players
Democratic Republic of the Congo male tennis players
American people of Democratic Republic of the Congo descent
Sportspeople from Ithaca, New York
Kentucky Wildcats men's tennis players
Tennis people from New York (state)